The 51181/51182 Devlali Bhusaval Passenger is a Passenger train belonging to Indian Railways that runs between Devlali and Bhusawal in India.

It operates as train number 51181 from Devlali to Bhusawal and as train number 52122 in the reverse direction.

Service
Devlali Bhusaval Passenger has a total of 30 halts from Devlalai to Bhusawal and covers a distance of 257 km in 5 hours 15 minutes. The Devlali Bhusaval Passenger is a Passenger train that comes under Bhusawal Railway Division of Indian Railways.

Routeing

See also
 Indian Railways

References

External links
  Ministry of Indian Railways, Official website

Transport in Nashik
Transport in Bhusawal
Rail transport in Maharashtra
Slow and fast passenger trains in India